Shootin' Up the World is the fourth album by hardcore punk band Discharge, released in 1993 on Clay Records.

Track listing
"Manson Child" (6:08)
"Lost in You" (2:44)
"Shootin Up the World" (2:34)
"Psycho Active" (2:28)
"Leaders Deceivers" (2:32)
"Fantasy Overload" (2:49)
"Down and Dirty" (2:46)
"Never Come to Care" (2:39)
"Real Live Snuff" (2:41)
"Exiled in Hell" (2:49)
"Reprise" (1:50)

References

Discharge (band) albums
1993 albums